The destruction of country houses in Ireland was a phenomenon of the Irish revolutionary period (1919–1923), which saw at least 275 country houses deliberately burned down, blown up, or otherwise destroyed by the Irish Republican Army (IRA). The vast majority of the houses, known in Ireland as big houses, belonged to the Anglo-Irish upper class known as the Protestant Ascendancy. The houses of some Roman Catholic unionists, suspected informers, and members or supporters of the new Irish Free State government were also targeted. Although the practice by the IRA of destroying country houses began in the Irish War of Independence, most of the buildings were destroyed during the Irish Civil War (1922–23). Today, most of the targeted buildings are in ruins or have been demolished. Some were restored by their owners, albeit often smaller in size, or were later rebuilt and re-purposed.

The Big House as a target

By the start of the Irish revolutionary period in 1919, the Big House had become symbolic of the 18th and 19th-century dominance of the Protestant Anglo-Irish class in Ireland at the expense of the native Roman Catholic population, particularly in southern and western Ireland.

The Anglo-Irish, as a class, were generally opposed to Irish republicanism and held key positions in the Dublin Castle administration. The Irish nationalist narrative maintained that the land of Irishmen had been illegally stolen from them by the Anglo-Irish aristocracy, who had mostly arrived in Ireland as Protestant settlers from Great Britain during the plantations of Ireland. The Anglo-Irish big house was at the administrative centre of the estates of the landowners, as well as being the family seat from which the Anglo-Irish exerted their political control over the island.

This perception was popularly held by nationalists, despite a considerable increase in Irish landownership in the previous decades due to the Irish Land Acts. Whereas in 1870, 97% of land was owned by landlords and 50% by just 750 families, by 1916, 70% of Irish farmers owned their own land. Catholics had been emancipated in 1829 and the political dominance of the Anglo-Irish in Ireland had consequently declined following the electoral successes of the Catholic nationalist Irish Parliamentary Party through much of the 19th century.

The former Protestant Ascendancy had lost its economic power following the Great Famine of 1845-49, and the Long Depression of the 1870s; and then lost its political power after the Representation of the People Act 1884. By 1915 the Irish Land Commission had transferred over 60% of Irish farmland to tenant farmers, leaving most of the former landed gentry with a house and a home farm known as a "demesne". The former landlords could afford to employ gardeners and household staff as they had received, as a group, the equivalent of over €60 billion (in 2019 euro) in compensation from the British government. Burning country houses from 1919 was therefore a largely symbolic act.

Irish War of Independence
In the destruction of the country houses of the aristocracy and landed gentry, the IRA hoped to overcome a culture of deference towards the landowning class. As early as 1918, IRA organiser Ernie O'Malley had his Volunteers train in demesne grounds to "rid them of their inherent respect for the owners".

During the Irish War of Independence, big houses were often targeted in reprisal for the destruction or defacement of houses owned by suspected IRA members or sympathisers by British forces (most commonly the Black and Tans and Auxiliary Division of the Royal Irish Constabulary). Anglo-Irish landowners typically held no influence over British counterinsurgency policies in any given area, and reprisal attacks on big houses by the IRA were bolstered by the assumption that their owners were always unionists. "In April 1921, north Cork IRA leader, Liam Lynch, enraged by the destruction of several houses in reprisal for an IRA ambush declared, 'six big houses and castles of their friends, the Imperialists will go up for this.'"

At least 76 country mansions were destroyed in the Irish War of Independence; 30 big houses were burned in 1920 and another 46 in the first half of 1921, mostly in the conflict's Munster heartland, i.e. the counties of Cork, Kerry, Tipperary, Clare and Limerick.

Historian James S. Donnelly stated in a study of the burning of over 50 country houses in County Cork from 1919 to 1921 that although there may have been agrarian or sectarian animosities at work, most of the houses targeted by the IRA were burnt either to deny them as potential billets to British forces or as reprisals for house burnings committed by British forces. Similarly, a study of the border region of counties of Louth, Cavan and Monaghan found no such burnings until June and July 1921, coinciding with a sizeable British Army offensive in the area and that the main motive was to deny the soldiers potential billets. "In this region at least it was the guerrilla tactics of the IRA and not agrarian motives that were main motive for targeting the Big Houses".

The "Big Houses" did not become the subject of a concerted campaign until the Irish Civil War. In this period there was also an increase in the level of violence towards protestant members County Cork. Of the 122 assassinated as "spies", 44, or about 36% were Protestants: about twice the percentage of Protestants in the civilian population of Cork. Mrs Mary (or Maria) Lindsay, an elderly Protestant from Coachford, was shot and killed, with her driver, in an outbuilding while her house was burning, after the authorities refused to commute the capital sentences of six IRA volunteers who were executed after Mrs. Lindsay had informed the authorities of a pending nearby ambush, after her efforts and that of a local priest to stop the pending ambush were ignored by the IRA. The degree to which such IRA violence can be categorised as sectarian as opposed to politically motivated is still the subject of much debate.

Irish Civil War

It is believed that 199 country houses were destroyed during the Civil War. Some mansions were destroyed in the fighting of the early months of the war, but the campaign against them began in earnest in late 1922. The leadership of the Anti-Treaty forces orchestrated a campaign of Big House destruction across Ireland. The order to burn houses of Free State supporters and 'Imperialists' (as the IRA called the Anglo-Irish upper class) was given after the Irish Free State government embarked on a policy of executions of anti-Treaty Republican fighters.

Liam Lynch, anti-Treaty IRA Chief of Staff, after the execution of four senior Republicans in Mountjoy Prison, issued a General order on 8 December 1922 that, "all Free State supporters are traitors and deserve the latter's stark fate, therefore their houses must be destroyed at once", and, on 26 January 1923, issued another order for property destruction and possible killing of Free State Senators in reprisal.

The ostensible reason for the coordinated attack on the 'Big Houses' therefore was that many of their owners were senators in the Senate or Seanad. However, others were targeted because the IRA listed them as "Imperialists" or in some cases 'Freemasons'. Most country houses were isolated and in rural areas, and targeting them forced the National Army to allocate their stretched resources to protecting landowners, while also creating an atmosphere of panic among Anglo-Irish people, as well as unionists in general. As such, the country house was regarded by the IRA as a "soft target".

Attacks were planned and organised, and generally focused on Irish peers who had sat in the House of Lords, members of the Senate of the Irish Free State and former Irish Unionist Party politicians. The assault on the "Big Houses" was part of a wider campaign against Free State supporters as a reprisal for the executions policy of the Government. In Dublin for instance, out of 28 homes burned by the IRA between 10 December 1922 and the end of April, nine could be counted as Big Houses or mansions associated with the Anglo-Irish aristocracy. As well as members of the gentry, the houses of newspaper owners and editors, members of the National Army and former British Army officers, and justices of the peace were also targeted.

Some Free State TDs, such as Liam Burke and Seán McGarry, were targeted; in the case of the latter causing the death of his seven-year-old son, Emmet. The former's home was demolished but the latter rebuilt his property. The Ballyboden home of the President of the Executive Council of the Irish Free State, W. T. Cosgrave, was burned down in January 1923. The Foxrock, County Dublin home of the Anglo-Irish politician Sir Horace Plunkett, a distant relation to Count Plunkett, was burnt down in 1923, despite his reputation as a social reformer.

Some houses, such as Ballycarty House, were purportedly also attacked to prevent their being used as garrisons by Free State forces. The size of the buildings targeted ranged from small to palatial. Most were destroyed by being set on fire, their interiors having been doused in petrol, although in some instances houses were blown up using high explosives. The attempt to burn down Burton Hall, Stillorgan, the home of Henry Guinness, in March 1923 failed when a mine planted there failed to explode.

In most cases, no one was injured during the destruction of the house. It is recorded that in several cases, members of the IRA helped the targeted family to remove their possessions from the house before it was destroyed. When the home of Dermot Bourke, 7th Earl of Mayo, was attacked on 29 January 1923, he described the IRA guerrillas as being "excessively polite" and apologetic. Nonetheless, there were incidents of violence and deaths in such attacks. The Church of Ireland Gazette recorded numerous instances of Unionists and Loyalists being shot, burned out or otherwise forced from their homes during the early 1920s.

Senator John Philip Bagwell was kidnapped during the attack on his home. Country houses were often looted during and following their destruction, and in most cases a family's possessions were entirely destroyed. Homes of pro-Treaty Catholic nationalists, such as Oliver St John Gogarty and George Moore were targeted. The former was rebuilt, but the latter was not. The library of Moore Hall, County Mayo, containing ancient manuscripts relating to Irish and world history, was entirely destroyed in February 1923.

Not all such houses were regarded by the IRA as targets, depending upon their ownership. Mount Trenchard House in Foynes,County Limerick  was the home of Mary Spring Rice, a nationalist activist, and the building was used by the IRA as a safe house.

Aftermath

Most of the properties targeted by the IRA were abandoned following the attacks. The widespread use of petrol and other incendiaries ensured that most of the buildings were completely gutted by fire and rendered uninhabitable. The state of the buildings, as well as fear of a repeat attack, meant that few of the country houses were rebuilt. Most were demolished, while others remain as ruins. Most of the owners sought compensation from the Irish Free State government. Ebenezer Pike claimed £62,000 for the destruction of Kilcrenagh House, arguing his losses were "enormous, for valuable furniture, paintings, and art treasures were all consumed in the flames."

Both of Sir Augustus Digby Warren's properties in County Cork were destroyed. William Downes Webber sought compensation from the Irish Free State totalling £149,000 for the rebuilding and £18,000 for the contents of Mitchelstown Castle; £27,500 for the building and the full £18,000 for the contents were eventually awarded by Justice Kenny in 1926. Webber deemed the award for rebuilding too small and relocated to Dublin.

The period of the destruction of the Big Houses came to play an important part in Irish culture. William Butler Yeats decried the targeting of big houses in the poem Meditations in Time of Civil War (1924). In The Last September (1929), Elizabeth Bowen mythologised the big houses as an ideal of civilisation and order, yet one which had its origins in injustice and could not be expected to survive in the modern world. The destructions were also haphazard and case-by-case. Some mansions like Dunsany Castle, owned by Edward Plunkett, 18th Baron of Dunsany, were spared because of his fame and because the house contained holy relics of the martyred Saint Oliver Plunket, that were revered and visited by local people. Other families such as the Shackleton family or the Guinness family were unaffected because of their local popularity, even though they were not supporters of Irish independence.

Resurgence during the Troubles

During the Troubles in Northern Ireland, the practice of targeting the big house was revived by the Provisional Irish Republican Army, although there were relatively few of these in the six counties. Most notoriously, Tynan Abbey was attacked on the night of 21 January 1981. The 86-year-old Sir Norman Stronge and his only son James, (both former MPs), were murdered by the Provisional Irish Republican Army. The house was then burnt to the ground. The bodies of Norman and James were later recovered from their burning home.

On 11 May 1991 a Provisional IRA unit armed with assault rifles and machine guns sprayed Caledon House in County Tyrone. An IRA statement released afterwards claimed that British soldiers guarding the house were the intended target and the unit involved had fired over seven hundred rounds.

List of houses destroyed

Additionally, 21 houses are being investigated as burnt in 1920: Ballintubber House, Ballyclough/Ballyclogh House, Ballyvary/Bellavary House, Beechlawn House, Birdhill (Marlfield Co Tipperary), Castlelambert/Castle Lambert House, Coolkellure/Coolkelure House, Crotto/Crotta House, Crowsnest, Doolin House/Castle, Glenart Castle, Glenfarne Hall, Hermitage (Co Limerick), Kilturra, Malin Hall, Moorock House, Mount Massey/Massy House, Roxborough House, Saunders Grove, Tanavalla/Garryantanvally.

Note: The 'Date of attack' is assumed to be overnight, either late at night on that day, or continuing/beginning in the early hours of the next day, unless clarified by the notation p.m. or a.m.

See also
Anglo-Irish big house
Destruction of country houses in 20th-century Britain

References

Sources

James S. Donnelly, Big House Burnings in County Cork during the Irish Revolution, 1920–21, Éire-Ireland (47: 3 & 4 Fall/Win 12); accessed. Retrieved 17 February 2015 
John Dorney, The Big House and the Irish Revolution, The Irish Story (21 June 2011); accessed. Retrieved 17 February 2015 
Lost Country Houses of Ireland and Northern Ireland and centenaries
Ellis Wasson, "The Irish Ascendancy: Counting Country Houses from the Middle Ages to the Twentieth Century" in The Role of Ruling Class Adaptability in the British Transition from Ancien Regime to Modern State (Lampeter: Edwin Mellen Press, 2010) 

Country houses in Ireland
History of Ireland (1801–1923)
Irish nationalism
Irish War of Independence
Violence in Ireland
1910s in Ireland
1920s in Ireland